Mi-sun, also spelled Mi-seon or Mee-sun, is a Korean unisex name, predominantly feminine. The meaning differs based on the hanja used to write each syllable of the name. There are 33 hanja with the reading "mi" and 41 hanja with the reading "seon" on the South Korean government's official list of hanja which may be registered for use in given names.

People with this name include:

Entertainers
Park Mi-sun (born 1967), South Korean actress and comedian
Jeon Mi-seon (born 1972), South Korean actress
Park Mi-seon (born 1979), stage name Park Si-yeon, South Korean actress
Kim Mi-sun (born 1986), stage name Song Ha-yoon, South Korean actress

Sportspeople
Kim Mi-sun (born 1964), South Korean field hockey player
Park Mi-seon (athlete) (born 1964), South Korean sprinter
Kang Mee-sun (born 1971), South Korean volleyball player
Lee Mi-sun (born 1979) South Korean basketball player 
Hong Mi-sun (born 1983), South Korean volleyball player
Choi Mi-sun (born 1996), South Korean recurve archer

Other
Shim Mi-seon (1988–2002), one of the victims of the Yangju highway incident

See also
List of Korean given names

References

Korean unisex given names